MPC, Mpc or mpc may refer to:

Astronomy
 Megaparsec (Mpc), unit of length used in astronomy
 Minor Planet Center, Smithsonian Astrophysical Observatory
 Minor Planet Circulars (MPC, M.P.C. or MPCs), astronomical publication from the Minor Planet Center

Businesses
 Mai-Liao Power Corporation, Taiwan
 Model Products Corporation, model kit manufacturer 
 Moving Picture Company, a visual effects company, London, UK
 MPC, maker of encrypted mobile phones

Computing and electronics
 Media Player Classic, a software media player
 MPC Computers, a former US computer maker
 Multimedia PC
 Multi Project Chip, sharing costs across projects
 Musepack, an audio codec
 Command-line client for the Music Player Daemon
 Akai MPC, series of music workstations
 Secure multi-party computation

Economics
 Marginal propensity to consume
 Monetary Policy Committee (United Kingdom)

Government and politics
 Central African Patriotic Movement (MPC), a rebel group in the Central African Republic
 Member of Provincial Council, a member of provincial councils in Sri Lanka
 Mizoram People's Conference, a regional political party in Mizoram, India
 Model Penal Code
 Myanmar Peace Centre

Military
 Marine Personnel Carrier, a US armored personnel carrier
 Military payment certificate, US military currency
 Military Police Corps (United States)

Places
 Michael Polanyi Center, Baylor University, Waco, Texas, US
 Mindanao Polytechnic College, Philippines
 Milton Peters College, Sint Maarten (operated by the Stichting Voortgezet Onderwijs van de Bovenwindse Eilanden)
 Monterey Peninsula College, California, US

Science and technology
 Model predictive control
 Magnetic particle clutch (or magnetic powder clutch)
 Metal phthalocyanine (MPc), a phthalocyanine used in dyeing
 Milk protein concentrate
 Multi-particle collision dynamics, a particle-based mesoscale simulation technique for complex fluids
 A Mitochondrial pyruvate carrier protein such as Mitochondrial pyruvate carrier 2

Other uses
 Most placeable candidate, recruiting industry term
 MPC Computers Bowl, a football bowl game
 Myanmar Press Council